Kasun Bodhisha (born 13 September 1985) is a Sri Lankan former cricketer. He played in 53 first-class and 43 List A matches between 2004/05 and 2012/13. He made his Twenty20 debut on 17 August 2004, for Galle Cricket Club in the 2004 SLC Twenty20 Tournament. He also played for Church and Oswaldtwistle Cricket Club in the Lancashire League in England during 2013.

References

External links
 

1985 births
Living people
Sri Lankan cricketers
Galle Cricket Club cricketers
Moors Sports Club cricketers
Saracens Sports Club cricketers
Place of birth missing (living people)